Craterocephalus stramineus commonly called blackmast or strawman is a species of Actinopterygii fish that was described by Gilbert Percy Whitley in 1950. Craterocephalus stramineus belongs to the genus Craterocephalus, and family Atherinidae. It has no subspecies listed.

References

stramineus
Taxa named by Gilbert Percy Whitley
Fish described in 1950